Newby is a village and civil parish in the Eden district of the county of Cumbria, England. Nearby is Newby Beck. Newby has a post office. The population at the 2011 Census was less than 100 and data was included with Sleagill.

Transport 
For transport there is the A6 road, the A66 road and the M6 motorway a few miles away.

Nearby settlements 
Nearby settlements include the large town of Penrith, the small town of Appleby-in-Westmorland and the villages of Morland, King's Meaburn, Cliburn, Sleagill and Newby Head which is part of the village.

See also

Listed buildings in Newby, Cumbria

References

External links

 Cumbria County History Trust: Newby (nb: provisional research only – see Talk page)
 http://www.newbyendfarm.co.uk/

Villages in Cumbria
Civil parishes in Cumbria
Eden District